Celestino Enrico Pancheri (ca. 1881 – 21 November 1961) was an Italian sculptor and carver who worked in Bromsgrove, Worcestershire.

He was born in Italy but came to England to work for the Bromsgrove Guild of Applied Arts  at the end of the 19th century. He settled in Bromsgrove and in partnership with Mr Hack, managed to buy the Old Coach House, setting up their own business Pancheri and Hack, around 1920.

Celestino Pancheri married Florence Gibbs in 1911. Their son, Robert followed his father into the trade, and the business was called Pancheri and Son.

Robert Pancheri

Robert Pancheri (22 June 1916 – 1996)  was educated at Bromsgrove School, saw service as a Captain in the Cheshire Regiment in the Second World War and was a lay preacher. On his father's death, he inherited the business.

Works
St Godwald's Church, Finstall. Reredos 1924.
Bromsgrove School Memorial Chapel. Reredos. 1930
Holy Trinity and St Mary's Church, Dodford. Woodcarving incl. Organ Case 1936
St Mary and All Saints' Church, Kidderminster. Oak Screen 1946 
St Denys’ Church, Severn Stoke. War Memorial Screen 1946
St Godwald's Church, Finstall Memorial to the Normandy landings 1946
St Mary the Virgin, Hanbury Royal Arms of Queen Elizabeth II 1954
St James' Church, Blakedown. Lectern 1954
St John the Baptist's Church, Suckley. Sanctuary fittings. 1956
St John the Baptist's Church, Longbridge. Carved statues in the west window. 1957
St Saviour's Church, West Hagley. Angel Lectern 1959
St Mary's Church, Elmbridge. Chancel alterations. 1960 - 1961
St Stephen's Church, Worcester. West screen. 1961
St Bartholomew's Church, Tardebigge. Pulpit. 1965
St John the Baptist's Church, Wolverley. Lectern 1965
St Peter's Church, Inkberrow. Vestry Screen. 1970
St John the Baptist's Church, Feckenham. Reredos 1971
St John the Baptist Church, Bromsgrove. Organ Screen 1969 - 1970 
St John the Baptist Church, Bromsgrove. Statue of St John the Baptist. 1973

References

1881 births
1961 deaths
British architectural sculptors
20th-century Italian sculptors
20th-century Italian male artists
Italian male sculptors
Modern sculptors